Radio Ethiopia, the second studio album by the Patti Smith Group, was released in October 1976 through Arista Records.

Background
Radio Ethiopia was the follow-up record to Smith's widely acclaimed debut Horses. In interviews surrounding the album's release, Smith explained that she chose producer Jack Douglas in hopes of making the album commercially successful. Smith co-wrote much of the album with bassist Ivan Král, the band member keenest for commercial success.

Music
The title track of the album is one of Smith's most notorious songs, almost legendary for appearing to be "10 minutes of noise". Critics often described live renditions of the song as negative moments of Smith's concerts. Smith herself spoke highly of the track and of how the lyrics refer to Arthur Rimbaud's dying wishes. Arguments both for and against the song have been advanced by critics, fans and music listeners over whether the song truly is an example of the Patti Smith Group's boundary-pushing or merely self-indulgence. 

"Ain't It Strange" and "Distant Fingers", the latter co-written with Smith's long-time boyfriend Allen Lanier, had both been staples of the Group's concerts long before the recording of Horses.

Artwork
The album's cover photograph is by Judy Linn, while the back of the album features a photo by Lynn Goldsmith. The album was dedicated to Arthur Rimbaud and Constantin Brâncuși. The back cover of the album bears the legend: "Free Wayne Kramer", who at the time was incarcerated in Kentucky following his conviction for dealing cocaine.

Critical reception

Radio Ethiopia was negatively received when it was released and Smith was attacked by critics for what they perceived to be laziness, self-indulgence and selling out. Critics in negative reviews cited that Douglas' production placed more emphasis on creating a heavy sound through numerous guitar parts that smothered Smith's vocals, and, at times, lamented that all of the album's songs were originals of the group.

In a contemporary review of Radio Ethiopia, Rolling Stone critic Dave Marsh opined that Smith "seems to lack the direction necessary to live up to her own best ideas". In Creem, Richard Meltzer was more enthusiastic and wrote that "there really ain't no way I'm gonna be anything but thrilled to my shorthairs by a Patti LP and this one's no exception." Village Voice critic Robert Christgau stated that the album's sound "delivers the charge of heavy metal without the depressing predictability; its riff power ... has the human elan of a band that is still learning to play."

AllMusic critic William Ruhlmann retrospectively described Radio Ethiopia as "a schizophrenic album in which the many elements that had worked so well together on Horses now seemed jarringly incompatible", noting that the Patti Smith Group had "encountered the same development problem the punks would—as they learned their craft and competence set in, they lost some of the unself-consciousness that had made their music so appealing." In 2001, the album was listed in Mojos "Ultimate CD Buyers Guide".

Track listingNotes "Radio Ethiopia" and "Abyssinia" were recorded live on August 9, 1976.

PersonnelPatti Smith Group Patti Smith – vocals, guitar (Fender Duo-Sonic), design
 Jay Dee Daugherty – drums, percussion, mixing, consultant
 Lenny Kaye – guitar (Fender Stratocaster), bass, vocals, mixing
 Ivan Král – bass, guitar
 Richard Sohl – keyboards, synthesizer, pianoAdditional personnel'
 Jack Douglas – production
 Vic Anesini – mastering
 Sam Ginsberg – engineering (assistant)
 Lynn Goldsmith – photography
 Nancy Greenberg – design
 Bob Irwin – mastering
 George Marino – mastering
 Jay Messina – mixing, engineering
 Rod O'Brien – engineering (assistant)
 Brian Sperber – engineering

Charts

Release history

References

External links
 
 

1976 albums
Albums produced by Jack Douglas (record producer)
Albums recorded at Record Plant (New York City)
Arista Records albums
Patti Smith albums